George Russell Sextet at the Five Spot is an album by George Russell originally released on Decca in 1960. The album contains performances by Russell with Al Kiger, David Baker, Dave Young, Chuck Israels and Joe Hunt. The Allmusic review by Ken Dryden states that "Although Russell plays more of a composer/arranger style of piano, his very challenging arrangements are very attractive. Anyone who enjoys his releases for RCA, Riverside, and Decca from around this period in his career should definitely acquire this sure-to-be-collectable CD".

Track listing
All compositions by George Russell except as indicated
 "Sippin' at Bells" (Miles Davis) - 7:19  
 "Dance Class" (Carla Bley) - 6:17  
 "Swingdom Come" - 7:30  
 "121 Bank Street" (David Baker) - 5:58  
 "Beast Blues" (Bley) - 8:56  
 "Moment's Notice" (John Coltrane) - 8:02  
Recorded September 20, 1960 in NYC

Personnel
George Russell: piano, arranger, conductor
Al Kiger: trumpet
David Baker: trombone
Dave Young: tenor saxophone
Chuck Israels: bass
Joe Hunt: drums

References

1960 albums
George Russell (composer) albums
Decca Records albums
Albums arranged by George Russell (composer)
Albums conducted by George Russell (composer)